The 2018 UK & Ireland Greyhound Racing Year was the 93rd year of greyhound racing in the United Kingdom and Ireland.

Roll of honour

Summary
The year revolved around two major events, the first was the ongoing battle for broadcasting rights between Satellite Information Services (SIS) and the Arena Racing Company (ARC). The second was the devastating news that Towcester racecourse, headed by Lord Hesketh was put into administration. On 23 August KPMG were appointed as administrators and 134 out of 137 members of staff at the racecourse were made redundant, many having to claim statutory redundancy from the government. The last greyhound meeting was on 12 August.

On 13 November it was announced by the administrators that the racecourse's assets were being sold to a company called Fermor Land LLP.  This company was formed on 18 October (26 days before the sale) and is headed by Lord Hesketh's brother-in-law Mark Westropp, a trustee of the Hesketh Family trusts.

Dorotas Wildcat won the last Derby at Towcester and then following a rest came back to win the Eclipse in late November. The Kevin Hutton trained black dog was the first Derby champion to win a competition (post Derby) since Taylors Sky in 2011.

News
On 9 April bookmakers and betting exchanges informed the Department for Digital, Culture, Media and Sport whether they were going to contribute to the British Greyhound Racing Fund. The fund which is pivotal for the welfare of greyhounds involved in Greyhound Board of Great Britain licensed racing is voluntary and based on the profits. Betfair and Sky Betting & Gaming were the high profile companies that refused to contribute which attracted criticism from the industry. One month later on 17 May, it was announced by Culture secretary Matt Hancock that betting stakes on fixed-odds betting terminals (known as FOBTs) would be reduced to £2 maximum. Consequently income generated by betting shops could reduce, which could affect the general health of both the horse racing and greyhound racing industries and lead to an uncertain period ahead.

Eight ex-Towcester trainers joined Henlow, including Mark Wallis and Nick Savva while Kevin Hutton joined Monmore and Patrick Janssens joined Central Park Stadium. Wallis would go on to extend his record number of wins as Greyhound Trainer of the Year by securing a tenth success and a seventh in succession despite a late challenge from Kevin Hutton.

John Gilburn died after a heart attack aged 65, the Sheffield director was an extremely popular figure within the industry. Former BGRB Chief Executive Geoffrey Thomas also died, he was best known for the 'New Deal', a failed attempt in 2002 to gain a better deal for the tracks from the bookmakers.

Tracks
Mildenhall Stadium closed to greyhound racing on 15 January following the ongoing problems experienced by the track, leaving 22 registered stadia with the Greyhound Board of Great Britain. The proposed Swindon Stadium development showed no further progress in relation to a new track layout, new housing now bordered the existing track and it had now passed the three year mark since Clarke Osborne (MD) had informed the greyhound connections that work was due to start.

Competitions
Mark Wallis won a third Trainers Championship stopping Kevin Hutton from winning a fourth consecutive title. The Other Reg secured the Scottish Greyhound Derby title. Hutton then made amends by winning his first Derby title with Dorotas Wildcat.

As a result of the Towcester administration three major events, the ECC Timber Puppy Derby, the Oaks and the TV Trophy were left uncontested in the racing schedule. The rights for the TV Trophy held by Greyhound Board of Great Britain was rescheduled for Crayford in December. Both the Oaks and Puppy Derby received new homes in Swindon and Henlow respectively.

Principal UK finals

Principal Irish finals

+ Track record

UK Category 1 & 2 competitions

+Delayed 2017 edition

Irish feature competitions

References 

Greyhound racing in the United Kingdom
Greyhound racing in the Republic of Ireland
UK and Ireland Greyhound Racing Year
UK and Ireland Greyhound Racing Year
UK and Ireland